In mathematical logic, more specifically in the proof theory of first-order theories, extensions by definitions formalize the introduction of new symbols by means of a definition. For example, it is common in naive set theory to introduce a symbol  for the set that has no member. In the formal setting of first-order theories, this can be done by adding to the theory a new constant  and the new axiom , meaning "for all x, x is not a member of ". It can then be proved that doing so adds essentially nothing to the old theory, as should be expected from a definition. More precisely, the new theory is a conservative extension of the old one.

Definition of relation symbols
,

Then the following hold:

The fact that  is a conservative extension of  shows that the defining axiom of  cannot be used to prove new theorems. The formula  is called a translation of  into .

Definition of function symbols
Assume that we can prove

,

We define formula  of  recursively as follows.
 
Then the following hold:

The formula  is called a translation of  into .

The construction of this paragraph also works for constants, which can be viewed as 0-ary function symbols.

Extensions by definitions

Such a formula is not unique, but any two of them can be proved to be equivalent in T.

In practice, an extension by definitions  of T is not distinguished from the original theory T. In fact, the formulas of  can be thought of as abbreviating their translations into T. The manipulation of these abbreviations as actual formulas is then justified by the fact that extensions by definitions are conservative.

Examples

In everyday mathematics, however, many other symbols are used such as the binary relation symbol , the constant , the unary function symbol P (the power set operation), etc. All of these symbols belong in fact to extensions by definitions of ZF.
 Let  be a first-order theory for groups in which the only primitive symbol is the binary product ×. In T, we can prove that there exists a unique element y such that x×y = y×x = x for every x. Therefore we can add to T a new constant e and the axiom
,
Then in  we can prove that for every x, there exists a unique y such that x×y=y×x=e.

Usually,  is denoted .

See also
 Conservative extension
 Extension by new constant and function names

Bibliography

 S. C. Kleene (1952), Introduction to Metamathematics, D. Van Nostrand
 E. Mendelson (1997). Introduction to Mathematical Logic (4th ed.), Chapman & Hall.
 J. R. Shoenfield (1967). Mathematical Logic, Addison-Wesley Publishing Company (reprinted in 2001 by AK Peters)

Mathematical logic
Proof theory